The Abdications of Bayonne took place on 7 May 1808 in the castle of Marracq in Bayonne when the French emperor Napoleon I forced two Spanish kings—Charles IV and his son, Ferdinand VII—to renounce the throne in his favour. The move was Napoleon's response to the Tumult of Aranjuez (17–19 March), when Ferdinand VII forced his father's first abdication, and the uprising of 2 May against French troops in Spain (present in accordance with the Treaty of Fontainebleau). Napoleon in his turn handed the crown of Spain to his brother Joseph Bonaparte. The result of the abdications was further resistance to the French presence, resulting in the Peninsular War (1808–1814), a contributing factor to Napoleon's final defeat. Napoleon was eventually forced to release Ferdinand. On 11 December 1813, he reinstalled him as King of Spain (Treaty of Valençay).

Pretenders to the Spanish throne
19th century in Spain
Peninsular War
Bayonne
Charles IV of Spain
Ferdinand VII of Spain
Bayonne